The 1907 Paris–Tours was the fourth edition of the Paris–Tours cycle race and was held on 22 September 1907. The race started in Paris and finished in Tours. The race was won by Georges Passerieu.

General classification

References

1907 in French sport
1907 in Paris
September 1907 sports events
1907